Kuwait National Stadium is a multi-purpose stadium in Kuwait City, Kuwait.  It is used mostly for football matches.  The stadium holds 16,000. It was the home ground of the Kuwait national football team.

Football venues in Kuwait
National stadiums
Multi-purpose stadiums in Kuwait